Tampoi or Tampoy can refer to:

Tampoi
 Baccaurea macrocarpa, a tropical fruit tree found in Southeast Asia
 Tampoi, Johor, a suburb of Johor Bahru, Malaysia

Tampoy
 Syzygium jambos, an ornamental and fruit tree of Southeast Asia
 Tampoy, part of the City of Malolos, Philippines